The 2023 Campeonato Carioca de Futebol (officially the Campeonato Carioca betnacional 2023 for sponsorship reasons) is the 120th edition of the top division of football in the state of Rio de Janeiro. The competition is organized by FERJ. It began on 12 January 2023 and will end on 9 April 2023.

Fluminense are the defending champions.

Participating teams

Format
In the main competition, the twelve clubs played each other on a single round-robin. This round-robin was the Taça Guanabara. The bottom team was relegated to the 2023 Série A2. While the top four clubs qualified for the final stage, the next four clubs (5th to 8th places) qualified for the Taça Rio. In the Taça Rio, the 5th-placed club will face the 8th-placed club, and the 6th-placed will face the 7th-placed. In the final stage, the winners of the Taça Guanabara will face the 4th-placed club, while the runners-up will face the 3rd-placed club.

In both of these four-team brackets (the Taça Rio and the final stage), the semi-finals and finals will be played over two legs, without the use of the away goals rule. In the semi-finals of both the Taça Rio and the final stage, the better placed teams on the Taça Guanabara table will advance in case of an aggregate tie. In the finals of both brackets, there will not be such advantage; in case of an aggregate tie, a penalty shoot-out will take place.

The top four teams from the Taça Guanabara and the winners of the Taça Rio will qualify for the 2024 Copa do Brasil

Taça Guanabara
<onlyinclude>

Taça Rio – Final stage

Final stage

Semi-finals

Group A

Group B

Finals

Torneio Independência
The Torneio Independência was contested by all the teams participating in the Campeonato Carioca except the "Big Four" of Rio de Janeiro (Botafogo, Flamengo, Fluminense and Vasco da Gama). Their standings were based in the results of the Taça Guanabara excluding all the matches played against the Big Four.
<onlyinclude>

Top goalscorers

References

Campeonato Carioca seasons
Carioca
2023 in Brazilian football